Stegasta abdita is a moth of the family Gelechiidae. It was described by Kyu-Tek Park and Mikhail Mikhailovich Omelko in 1994. It is found in Primorsky Krai in the Russian Far East and Japan.

References

Moths described in 1994
Stegasta